Channeling the Quintessence of Satan is the fifth studio album release by Austrian black metal band Abigor. It was released in 1999.

Track listing

"Dawn of Human Dust" – 5:49
"Pandemonic Revelation" – 4:56
"Equilibrium Pass By" – 6:18
"Wildfire and Desire" – 4:12
"Utopia Consumed" – 4:36
"Demon's Vortex" – 6:04
"Towards Beyond" 5:05
"Pandora's Miasmic Breath" – 4:20

Credits

Thurisaz – Vocals, bass
P.K. – Guitar
T.T. – Drums, guitar

External links
 Encyclopaedia Metallum page

1998 albums
Abigor albums
Napalm Records albums